Krzysztof Tadeusz Szumski (born 11 May 1944, Pilzno) is a Polish diplomat, ambassador to the Philippines (1991–1993), Thailand (1993–1997), Indonesia (2000–2005), and China (2005–2009).

Life 

Szumski graduated from Main School of Planning and Statistics, External Trade Faculty, where he began his professional career. He has been member of the Polish Students' Association (1962–1968), and Polish United Workers' Party (1965–1990).

Since 1970, he has been cooperating with Polish intelligence (alias "Tadeusz"), two years later becoming employed by the Ministry of Interior. At the same time, in 1971, he joined the Ministry of Foreign Affairs. He served at the embassy in Paris (1980s). Four times he was appointed an ambassador: to the Philippines (1991–1993), Thailand (1993–1997), Indonesia (2000–2005), and China (2005–2009).

Honours 

 Officer of the Order of Polonia Restituta, Poland, 2010
 Knight Grand Cross of the Order of the White Elephant, Thailand

References 

1944 births
Ambassadors of Poland to China
Ambassadors of Poland to Indonesia
Ambassadors of Poland to Thailand
Ambassadors of Poland to the Philippines
Living people
Officers of the Order of Polonia Restituta
Polish United Workers' Party members
SGH Warsaw School of Economics alumni
Polish diplomats
People from Dębica County